"Bruce Lee" is a song by Underworld that appears on the album Beaucoup Fish. The song did not chart (and only the 12" single was eligible to do so, as the CD format exceeded the time limit), but was notable for its remix by The Micronauts, which did have some minor success.

Track listings

CD: Junior Boy's Own; JBO5010116P (UK)
 "Bruce Lee" – 4:42
 "Bruce Lee" (The Micronauts Remix) – 8:56
 "Cups" – 11:45
 "Cups" (Salt City Orchestra's Vertical Bacon Vocal) – 9:23

CD: Junior Boy's Own; JBO5010033 (UK)
 "Bruce Lee" (Short) – 3:00
 "Bruce Lee" (The Micronauts Remix) – 8:56
 "Cups" (Salt City Orchestra's Vertical Bacon Vocal) – 9:23
 "Bruce Lee" (Dobropet) – 4:10

12": Junior Boy's Own; JBO5010036 (UK)
 "Bruce Lee" (The Micronauts Remix) – 8:56
 "Cups" (Salt City Orchestra Vertical Bacon Vocal) – 9:23

CD: V2 Records Japan; V2CI 62 (JP)
 "Bruce Lee" (Short) – 2:59
 "Bruce Lee" (The Micronauts Mix) – 8:57
 "Bruce Lee" (Buffalo Daughter Mix) – 4:21
 "Cups" (Salt City Orchestra's Vertical Bacon Remix) – 9:23
 "Bruce Lee" (album version) – 4:41
 "Bruce Lee" (Dobropet) – 4:10

Junior Boy's Own; JBO5011253P (UK)
 "Bruce Lee" (Short) – 2:59

Appearances
 "Bruce Lee" appears on the album Beaucoup Fish.
"Bruce Lee" also appears on the final episode of season 3 of Chris Morris' Blue Jam radio program.

References

External links
Underworld discography pages at dirty.org
Underworldlive.com
Single information from the unofficial Underworld discography web site - BigScreenSatellite

Underworld (band) songs
1999 singles
1998 songs
Songs written by Darren Emerson
Songs written by Rick Smith (musician)
Songs written by Karl Hyde